The Madina Mosque is a mosque in Bridgetown, Barbados.

History
The mosque was opened in February 1957. On 25 January 2020, the mosque was declared a historical building by Barbados National Trust.

See also
 Islam in Barbados

References

External links
 

1957 establishments in Barbados
Buildings and structures in Bridgetown
Mosques completed in 1957
Mosques in Barbados